The Girl in Tails (Swedish: Flickan i frack) is a 1956 Swedish comedy film directed by Arne Mattsson and starring Maj-Britt Nilsson, Folke Sundquist and Anders Henrikson. It was shot at the Centrumateljéerna Studios in Stockholm. The film's sets were designed by the art director Nils Nilsson. It was based on the 1925 novel The Girl in Tails by Hjalmar Bergman, previously adapted into a 1926 silent film of the same title.

Synopsis
In a small Swedish town, a young woman causes a shock by wearing male evening dress to a prom.

Cast

 Maj-Britt Nilsson as 	Katja Kock
 Folke Sundquist as 	Ludwig von Battwhyl
 Anders Henrikson as 	Headmaster Starck
 Naima Wifstrand as 	Widow Hyltenius
 Sigge Fürst as Karl-Axel Kock
 Hjördis Petterson as Colonel's wife
 Lennart Lindberg as 	Curry Kock
 Elsa Prawitz as Brita Bjurling
 Georg Rydeberg as Paulin
 Sif Ruud as 	Lotten Brenner
 Torsten Winge as 	Karl-Otto
 Birgit Kronström as 	Lizzy Willman
 Erik Berglund as 	Biörck
 Ester Roeck Hansen as Karolina Willman
 Erik Strandmark as 	Blom
 Kerstin Dunér as 	Eva Biörk
 Lasse Krantz as 	Lindkvist
 Rut Holm as 	Mari
 Pierre Fränckel as Johan Markurell 
 Julia Cæsar as 	Modig
 Sven Magnusson as 	Ström
 Stina Ståhle as 	Mrs. Markurell
 John Norrman as 	Glad
 Magnus Kesster as 	Mr. Markurell
 Curt Löwgren as 	Karlsson
 Einar Axelsson as 	Björner
 Manne Grünberger as	Klein
 Ludde Juberg as Stoker
 John Melin as 	Olsson
 Carl-Axel Elfving as 	Constable 
 Stig Johanson as 	Postman
 Per-Axel Arosenius as Farm hand 
 Albin Erlandzon as 	Farm Hand
 Marrit Ohlsson as Musician 
 Georg Skarstedt as Musician

References

Bibliography 
 Qvist, Per Olov & von Bagh, Peter. Guide to the Cinema of Sweden and Finland. Greenwood Publishing Group, 2000.

External links 
 

1956 films
Swedish comedy films
1956 comedy films
1950s Swedish-language films
Films directed by Arne Mattsson
1950s Swedish films